Home and Away is an Australian soap opera first broadcast on the Seven Network on 17 January 1988. The 3rd season of Home and Away began airing from 8 January 1990. The following is a list of characters that first appeared in 1990, by order of first appearance. They were all introduced by the show's executive producer Des Monaghan. In January, Rebekah Elmaloglou began appearing as Sophie Simpson. The following month Craig McLachlan and Julian McMahon took on the respective roles of school teacher Grant Mitchell and soldier Ben Lucini. March saw the introduction of Jaiman Paget Bayly as recurring character Murray "Mullet" Jensen. Beach House landlord Ernie Jacobs (David Weatherley) made his debut in April, while Craig Black began his second role in the serial as student Paul Jensen in May. Josephine Mitchell joined the cast as policewoman Jane Holland. Les Hill and Belinda Jarrett joined the show in July as the Dean siblings, Blake and Karen. Kate Raison arrived in September playing the role of Jennifer Atkinson, a love interest for Steven Matheson (Adam Willits). October saw the arrival of divorcé Michael Ross, played by Dennis Coard, later to become Debra Lawrance's real-life husband. The following week, he was joined by his teenage son Haydn, played by Andrew Hill. In November, Rachael Beck joined the cast as guest character Kim, the sister of established character, Grant.

Sophie Simpson

Sophie Simpson, played by Rebekah Elmaloglou, debuted on-screen during the episode broadcast on 23 January 1990 and appeared until 1993. Elmaloglou once took a break from filming due to exhaustion, and quit the serial to pursue other projects as her work load took a negative impact on her health. Elmaloglou made subsequent guest appearances as Sophie in 2002, 2003 and 2005.

Grant Mitchell

Grant Mitchell, played by Craig McLachlan, debuted on-screen during the episode broadcast on 9 February 1990. McLachlan departed the series that year, though filmed additional appearances which were not aired until the following year. Grant last appeared on 20 September 1991. McLachlan described Grant as being "pretty trendy for a teacher". Grant is "loved" by students because he chooses to rebel against the establishment. However, Grant loves teaching and his pupils. For his portrayal of Grant, MacLachan won the "Most Popular Actor" award at the 1991 Logie Awards.

Ben Lucini

Benito "Ben" Lucini, played by Julian McMahon, debuted on-screen during the episode broadcast on 27 February 1990 and remained until 1 May 1991. McMahon had to audition four times, before the producers agreed that he was right for the role of Ben. Ben was described as being "relaxed" and "easy-going" for a twenty-one-year-old male. Ben is an Italian character and comes from a large family. Ben used to have a liking for partying and booze, but as he grew older he matured and changed his outlook in life. Ben is a soldier, he soon falls in love with the town and established character Carly Morris (Sharyn Hodgson) and leaves the army. Hodgson described Ben as having "traditional values" and "stability". Carly admires these traits and feels ready to settle down with him. Ben and Carly marry and Hodgson predicted that their marriage would be successful because they "really do want what is best for each other". McMahon quit Home and Away the same year that his character arrived. Peter Holmes of The Sydney Morning Herald was critical of McMahon's acting in the role, calling him "wooden" and saying he did "a splendid impression of a Thunderbird".

Mullet

Murray "Mullet" Jensen, played by Jaiman Paget Bayly, first appeared on 26 March 1990 and departed on 18 July 1990. In their book Home and Away Annual, Kesta Desmond and David Nicholls describe Mullet as an "energetic and boisterous eleven-year-old". He is an "average country kid" with an "adventurous and cheeky" side to his persona. His real name is Murray, but due to his extreme liking for fishing, he adopts the nickname "Mullet". Mullet is also an outsider and "contents himself" with life's simple pleasures. He is the type of child that is easily entertained, more so with a fishing rod. Mullet's family live below the poverty line. His mother, Lorraine Jensen (Elizabeth Chance), has been unable to provide Mullet and his older brother, Paul Jensen (Craig Black), with the luxuries other children get. Mullet does not have pocket money, so he decides to sell his fish to Ailsa Stewart (Judy Nunn).

Mullet takes a liking to classmate Sally Fletcher (Kate Ritchie). Sally is annoyed with his constant following of her and avoids him at every opportunity. Eventually, Sally relents and they become friends. Mullet brings home a crab to the Fletcher family and they serve it up for dinner, not knowing that the crab is in fact, Alf Stewart's (Ray Meagher) pet crab "Claws". Alf is upset but Mullet offers to help him fish as way of an apology. When Sally asks about Mullet's home, he becomes evasive and refuses to let her see his house as his family does not have much money. Mullet goes as far to invent an excuse that his mother, Lorraine has been hospitalised after burning herself while cooking. Sally soon discovers the truth and tells him it does not matter and invites him to be a guest at Carly Morris (Sharyn Hodgson) and Ben Lucini's (Julian McMahon) wedding, which he accepts. When Mullet takes Tammy Newton (Katy Edwards) fishing, Sally becomes jealous. After Tammy leaves, Mullet and Sally audition for the Surf Club's talent night performing "There's a Hole in My Bucket" and on opening night they make several mistakes in the act, which raises a laugh from the audience who assume it is scripted but Sally does not see the funny side. Later in the evening, Mullet assists Adam Cameron (Mat Stevenson) in a magic trick where he creates the illusion of sawing his assistant Marilyn Chambers (Emily Symons) in half. The trick is ruined when Mullet, posing as Marilyn's feet, gets out of the box. After Marilyn gives Mullet and Sally dancing lessons and Mullet decides he wants to be a pop star and changes his image which does little to impress Sally and reverts to his old look. Mullet attends the wedding and dances with Sally at the reception. After this, Mullet is not seen again but he is mentioned by Steven Matheson (Adam Willits) a decade later when he teases Sally about past romances in the aftermath of her failed wedding to Kieran Fletcher (Spencer McLaren).

Ernie Jacobs
Ernie Jacobs, played by David Weatherley, debuted on-screen during the episode broadcast on 16 April 1990 and last appeared on 9 January 1991.

Ernie rents the beach house out to Matt Wilson (Greg Benson), Adam Cameron (Mat Stevenson) and Marilyn Chambers (Emily Symons). The three decide to set Ernie up. Marilyn invites Ernie around for a date and attempts to seduce him. Matt and Adam wait outside with a camera, when Ernie kisses Marilyn, Adam takes a photograph. Matt notices that the picture has not developed correctly, but Adam enters the house and presents Ernie with the picture. After he and Matt burn the kitchen linoleum while making some toffee, Adam replaces it with turf that is infested with fleas, which then begin to populate the house. Ernie arrives at the house to confront Adam, but he detonates a flea bomb. Ernie throws the bomb out of the window, causing it to smash. He then threatens to evict his three tenants. Ernie runs for councillor and is happy when Alf Stewart (Ray Meagher) is forced to drop his campaign when he is charged with driving over the alcohol limit. Bobby Simpson (Nicolle Dickson) decides to run in direct competition to stop Ernie getting into power. Marilyn later finds an incriminating letter and she and Bobby blackmail Ernie. Ernie later sells the house to Marilyn.

Paul Jensen

Paul Jensen, played by Craig Black, debuted on-screen during the episode 8 May 1990. Black previously played the role of Travis in one episode. Paul is seventeen years old when he first arrives in Summer Bay. He is the son of Michael and Lorraine Jensen (Elizabeth Chance) and the older brother of Mullet (Jaiman Paget Bayly). Paul is described as a "warm and articulated young man, slightly above average in academic ability." Paul is good friends with Steven Matheson (Adam Willits). Paul's father, Michael is a failed country and western musician. His failures caused the breakdown of his marriage with Lorraine. Paul is "blessed with a great musical talent far more than his father ever possessed". Lorraine becomes adamant that Paul will not pursue a career in music; despite his "obvious talent". Lorraine banned all musical instruments from being used in their home. Paul's talent is totally "self-taught" and by giving up his lunch breaks, he secretly practised on the school and surf club pianos.

Grant Mitchell (Craig McLachlan) finds Paul playing the piano in secret on his lunch break. Grant tells Paul that he is talented and told him to apply for a music scholarship in order to afford his own instrument. Paul refuses the offer and takes a job at Alf Stewart's (Ray Meagher) shop instead and buys a second hand one. Lorraine becomes annoyed with Paul for running up her electricity bills. Grant helps Paul train, but Lorraine finds out and tells him that he is wasting his life attempting to pursue a music career. Paul tells Grant to leave him alone, so Grant organises a school concert with the aim of showing everyone Paul's talent, but he refuses to take part. Paul makes friends with Emma Jackson (Dannii Minogue) and develops an attraction to her. Emma starts to feel the same, despite already dating Adam Cameron (Mat Stevenson). Emma listens to Paul playing the piano and compliments him. Paul cannot handle the praise and Emma realises that he wrote the piece for her. Emma asks him to play the song for her again and then kisses him. Emma tells Paul that she is still with Adam.

Lorraine later decides to support Paul's musical ambitions and he takes part in the concert. When Adam finds out about Paul and Emma, he challenges Paul to a fight. The pair start brawling after Adam insults his father, Michael. Alf decides to set up a fair boxing match between the pair. Alf and Steven help Paul train. Emma tries to stop the fight but it goes ahead and soon gets out of hand. Emma is annoyed that two men are fighting over her, so Marilyn Chambers (Emily Symons), Sophie Simpson (Rebekah Elmaloglou) and Carly Morris (Sharyn Hodgson) help Emma sabotage the fight by throwing buckets of water over them. Paul is angry with Emma for embarrassing him and tries to end their relationship, but Emma talks him around. Vicki Baxter (Nana Coburn) plants exam papers in Emma's locker, causing her to be expelled from school. Paul is unsure of whether to believe that Emma is innocent, so she dumps him. Paul and Steven hatch a plan to prove that Vicki was behind the plot, by pretending to date her. Vicki confesses to planting them and Paul clears Emma's name. Ailsa Stewart (Judy Nunn) and Bobby Simpson (Nicolle Dickson) convince Emma that Paul is a good person and she forgives him. Emma secures a job on the Gold Coast and has to move away. She tells him that her feelings have changed, but still wants to remain friends and leaves him behind.

Jane Holland

Jane Holland, played by Josephine Mitchell, made her first appearance on 22 June 1990. Mitchell began filming her guest stint in April 1990, she was contracted to appear in the show for two months. She stated "It's wonderful, but very demanding. The hours are much longer than in A Country Practice." Jane is a police constable, who is introduced as a love interest for Grant Mitchell (Craig McLachlan). Mitchell knew McLachlan socially before they worked together and described him as "a really lovely person." She was grateful to producer Andrew Howie for thinking of her for the role, as Jane was a different type of character for her to play. Mitchell was well known for playing Jo Loveday in A Country Practice at the time. She told David Brown from TV Week that Jane is completely different from Jo because the new role required her to be aggressive. She was also surprised to hear she had won the role of a police officer. Mitchell said: "Jane Holland is a young constable, with lots of emphasis on the word 'young'. She comes to Summer Bay and sets up shop there." The actress said that Jane "intermingles" with most of the serial's characters during her tenure, but her main interest is in Grant. Knowing she would be working with McLachlan was one of the reasons Mitchell wanted the role.

Jane arrives to work in Summer Bay and she soon begins to date Grant. Jane arrests Alf Stewart (Ray Meagher) for being over the legal alcohol limit after breathalysing him, which causes him to forfeit his license. When a shootout occurs in Yabbie Creek and an officer is killed, Grant fears the worst. Jane is found to be alive but is devastated over her colleague's death and is visibly affected. When two thugs harass Marilyn Chambers (Emily Symons) at the diner, Jane is quick to apprehend them. Grant worries and suggests she takes some time off. Jane contemplates quitting altogether. Over the next few weeks Jane and Grant's relationship fails and Jane returns to the police force in the city.

Blake Dean

Blake Dean played by Les Hill made his first on-screen appearance on 26 July 1990. In their book Home and Away Annual, Kesta Desmond and David Nicholls describe Blake as being the "sort of boy any parent would be proud to call their son." Blake is "high spirited, loves life and lives it to the full". He has natural charm and is a quick thinker, this helps him to escape trouble. Blake is the older brother of Karen Dean (Belinda Jarrett) and he tries to protect her from the scrapes she gets herself into. Hill later announced his departure from the series via an interview in TV Week. The actor has since reprised the role including guest appearances for the serial's fourteenth anniversary and the 4,000th episode.

Karen Dean

Karen Dean, played by Belinda Jarrett, made her first appearance on-screen during the episode broadcast on 26 July 1990 and departed on 27 August 1991. She briefly returned in 1993, making her final appearance on 19 February that year. Karen arrives in Summer Bay alongside her brother Blake (Les Hill) after their mother, Margot dies from cancer.

In David Nicholls and Kesta Desmond's Home and Away Annual, they described her early characterisation. Karen is fifteen years old when she arrives in Summer Bay, an "attractive" yet "slightly reserved girl" she spends her time experimenting with her image. Karen watches her weight and hair because she has body image issues. She has a "sweet nature, a ready, tough sometimes, self-conscious smile, and a joyous love of life." They described her love life as being in the "awakening stages" but does not like males of her own age. Karen is popular at school with both pupils and teachers alike. However, the duo incorrectly predicted that she would follow a successful career path and develop a beautiful personality as she reaches womanhood.

Karen and Blake arrive in town looking for Ailsa Stewart (Judy Nunn), their mother Margot's former cellmate. They want to stay with her after they fall out with their uncle Alec (Norm Galton). Ailsa's husband Alf (Ray Meagher) is resistant at first but she talks him around. Karen and Blake get into many scrapes when they befriend Sophie Simpson (Rebekah Elmaloglou). Karen takes an interest in Steven Matheson (Adam Willits) after learning his girlfriend, Viv Newton (Mouche Phillips) has sent him a letter ending their relationship. Karen tries various methods to get time alone with Steven but they backfire, so she sends him an anonymous love letter. Steven assumes Sophie wrote the letter but she sets him straight. Ailsa discovers Karen's feelings for Steven after she denies it. The truth is revealed and Steven tells Karen he is flattered but it cannot work as he is several years older than her. Karen begins to feel left out when Blake and Sophie begin dating.

Karen and Blake soon find themselves the target of new deputy principal Alan Stone's (Philip Hinton) rage when he exceeds his authority by reinstating caning. Stone is eventually transferred elsewhere. Karen falls for Haydn Ross (Andrew Hill) when he transfers to Summer Bay High but is crushed when it becomes clear he is attracted to Sophie. This puts strain on their friendship but Karen and Sophie convince Blake and Haydn to become friends. When a tree planted by Alf's grandfather, Angus is under threat, Karen takes part in a protest and chains herself to the tree. When Maurice "Revhead" Gibson (Gavin Harrison) returns to Summer Bay, Karen is attracted to him. Alf is quick to warn her about Revhead as he is a criminal and tried to sexually assault his daughter Roo Stewart (Justine Clarke) two years previously. Karen refuses to listen and continues dating Revhead, who drags her into crime, including a robbery on Alf's store. Revhead tells Karen to join him on the run and tells her to steal Blake and Haydn's Morris Minor. That night Adam Cameron (Mat Stevenson) tries to talk sense into Karen to get her to return by jumping into the car but they crash into David Croft (Guy Pearce). Adam escapes with minor injuries and David is killed instantly. After initially blaming Adam, Karen then confesses and is arrested and imprisoned for two years.

Karen is paroled in early 1993 and returns to the Bay and resumes living with the Stewarts and meets her and Blake's long-lost half-sister, Roxanne Miller (Lisa Lackey). Blake is shocked to learn that Karen's time in prison has not changed her, especially when she starts a fight in a nightclub, which results in Blake getting punched while trying to defend her. Ailsa and Blake's girlfriend, Finlay Roberts (Tina Thomsen) are irritated by Karen's attitude. Karen then steals some money from Ailsa and flees to the city. Blake tracks her down where she is staying with a former cellmate. Karen refuses to return so Blake moves to the city in order to keep an eye on her.

Jennifer Atkinson
Jennifer Atkinson (née Stewart) played by Kate Raison debuted on-screen during the episode broadcast on 12 September and departed on 16 October 1990. In their book Home and Away Annual Kesta Desmond and David Nicholls said that Jennifer would be introduced as a new love interest of Steven Matheson (Adam Willits). They described her as "an artist who draws his attention for what turns out to be a pretty torrid affair". They added that it could all "end in tears" for the couple. A columnist from Inside Soap also named their affair "torrid", adding that Jennifer "taught Steven everything he knew".

Jennifer is Alf Stewart's (Ray Meagher) Cousin who arrives in Summer Bay. When the subject of her husband Daniel (Ken Radley) is approached, Jennifer is evasive. She reveals to Donald Fisher (Norman Coburn) and Bobby Simpson (Nicolle Dickson) that Daniel drinks and hits her. Steven is attracted to Jennifer and they begin a relationship. Steven lies that he is older than 17 and does not attend school but is at college. When Steven sees Alan Stone (Philip Hinton) kissing Jennifer, he is jealous and trashes his caravan. Jennifer tells Steven that Stone came on to her and he is an old friend of Daniel's. Jennifer and Steven later sleep together. Stone catches Steven and Jennifer kissing and phones Daniel and informs him of the relationship, which results in Daniel hitting Steven over the head with a large tree branch, injuring him. Jennifer later ends things with Steven and leaves the Bay but not before telling Steven to go back to school and complete Year 12. She later sends Steven a card at Christmas and he makes a visit to the city to visit her but he decides not to.

Michael Ross

Michael Ross, played by Dennis Coard, made his first appearance on 22 October 1990. The character was introduced along with his son Haydn Ross (Andrew Hill). He quickly became a love interest for Pippa Fletcher (Debra Lawrance). Michael and Pippa strike up a friendship, but her family "are a bit wary of the man in their mother's life." Pippa tells them that nothing is going on, but after going out to dinner with Michael, she becomes "defensive" about the relationship. Michael assures her that he wants to be good friends, but David Brown of TV Week reported that they would end the year with a kiss and their relationship would move "into top gear" during the new year. He also reported that drama would come in the form of Michael's former wife who turns up in Summer Bay. Another columnist for TV Week said that Michael's relationship with Pippa was controversial and had people's "tongues wagging". This was because Pippa was still mourning the loss of her husband Tom Fletcher (Roger Oakley) and Michael was a divorcé. In 1996, producers took the decision to write the character out by killing him off. After five and a half years in the role, Coard believed it was the right time for him to leave, saying "the finality of it doesn't worry me because, if he hadn't been killed off, in a year's time they might have lured me back. But once I'd made the break, I'd much rather get on and do other things." On-screen, heavy rains cause a flood and mudslide, which Sam Marshall (Ryan Clark) gets caught up in. Michael saves Sam, but is swept away and drowned. Coard was pleased that Michael received a heroic "grand finale". He added that Michael would not be returning as a ghost to Pippa, commenting "I heard a rumour about it but I said no!"

Michael arrives in Summer Bay as the new owner of the local boat shed and begins staying in the caravan park. Ben Lucini (Julian McMahon) takes an instant dislike to Michael because he had intended to purchase the business himself. Michael is soon joined by his teenage son, Haydn Ross who is unhappy at having had to leave his private boarding school and move into a caravan. Michael is attracted to Pippa Fletcher, but she is unsure of her feelings because her husband Tom had died only six months before. In time, he and Pippa start dating. Pippa's adoptive daughter, Sally (Kate Ritchie) and Michael's son Haydn resent the new relationship at first but later come to terms with it. Michael and Pippa's fledging relationship meets a bump in the road when his ex-wife Cynthia (Belinda Giblin) arrives in the Bay hoping to give their marriage another go. She manages to manipulate Pippa into breaking up with Michael but her plan is ultimately unsuccessful. Michael and Pippa resume their relationship.

When Michael nearly drowns in an accident at the boat shed, he is spurred into asking Pippa to marry him. Although the two of them have admitted that they love each other, Pippa turns him down because she is scared of getting hurt again. Michael is devastated but when he finally gets through to her a few days afterwards, she says yes. After their wedding, Michael adopts Pippa's son, Christopher (Shaun Wood) as well as taking responsibility for various foster children. Some months later, Haydn falls out with Michael and moves away to live with his mother. The following year, Michael and Pippa learn they are expecting their first child and Pippa gives birth to their son, Dale. Within a few weeks, Dale dies of SIDS, leaving them devastated. Dale's death puts a severe strain on their marriage but they overcome that. A year later, Haydn returns to Summer Bay out of the blue. Although he convinces Michael that he wants to settle in the area and to set up a surf shop, it is all an elaborate ruse. He is a gambling addict with large debts that need paying. He steals the money Michael has borrowed from the bank to help him get started. He leaves his father in debt, something that has repercussions further down the line. Although Michael tries to help Haydn deal with his addiction, it does not work. Haydn is not ready to stop gambling and he leaves the Bay again.

Left heavily in debt because of Haydn's stunt, Michael puts the boat shed up for auction. It does not sell but Alf Stewart (Ray Meagher) later offers to step in as a silent business partner. Michael continues to run the business. Still, the stress of paying off Haydn's debt, trying to run the boat shed, the caravan park, a kiosk in the surf club and raising 6 kids takes its toll on him. He starts to feel he is being taken for granted by the kids and comes under a lot of stress. Worse still, it causes cracks to appear in his marriage to Pippa. Just before Christmas, Michael decides that the only way to save their marriage is for him to move out. He goes to live in the storeroom over his boat shed. On Christmas Day, the troubles at home drive a distraught Sally to run away from home for a while. Irene Roberts (Lynne McGranger) suggests to Michael that he and Pippa should try marriage counselling. He takes her advice and books a counsellor. It takes a little time but the counselling works and he gets back together with Pippa.
 
Michael and Alf fall out over a new time-share development, but they put their quarrel to one side and resume their friendship. When a small seaplane crashes in the outback Michael, Joseph "Joe" Lynch (Justin Rosniak), Jack Wilson (Daniel Amalm), Shane Parrish (Dieter Brummer) go out to find the six missing occupants. They find Angel Parrish (Melissa George), Dylan Parrish (Corey Glaister) and Teresa Lynch (Diane Craig) alive, but the pilot did not survive. They soon realise that two other passengers are missing and Michael sets out to find them. He discovers a handmade bag with shells in it before he finds the body of the Yugoslavian man but finds his daughter Maya Krakajcek (Xenia Natalenko) and takes her to hospital. With both her parents deceased and there being no other relatives, Maya comes to live at the Ross's. Jan Connolly (Pat Pitney) takes her back to Yugoslavia after some relatives of Maya's are found there. Michael is devastated because he had really bonded with the girl and she was the first foster child he had brought into his home.

When a large flood devastates Summer Bay as a result of a storm, Michael and Jack go out into the night to pick up Sam Marshall. Sam falls into the flooded stream and Michael jumps in to save him. Sam makes it safely to land but Michael finds himself in difficulty. Jack tries to hold on to him but the current is too strong and Michael is swept downstream. The next day, Michael's body is found and Steven Matheson (Adam Willits) breaks the news to Pippa that Michael has died.

Haydn Ross

Haydn Ross played by Andrew Hill first appeared on 31 October 1990 and departed on 17 September 1991. He returned in 1994 and 1996. Hill told Nigel May from Look-in that he won the role of Haydn by chance because agent made a mistake during the application process. In 1991, Hill decided to leave the series. A columnist for TV Week said that when Haydn arrives in Summer Bay, he thinks it is a "hick town". Haydn is the son of Cynthia (Belinda Giblin) and Michael Ross (Dennis Coard), he benefited from his father's business by attending a private school. In their book Home and Away Annual Kesta Desmond and David Nicholls describe Haydn as being "athletic and determined like his father"; but like his mother, too, because he has a "love of culture and a comfortable lifestyle".

Kim Mitchell

Kim Mitchell, played by Rachael Beck, first appeared on-screen during the episode broadcast 8 November 1990. Beck was cast in the role of Kim, who was introduced as the sister of established character Grant Mitchell (Craig McLachlan). Producers decided that they wanted Kim to become a regular character and offered Beck a twelve-month contract. Beck turned down the offer because she did not want to become a typecast actress.

Kim arrives in Summer Bay and tries to conceal a drug addiction, despite the fact that she is only sixteen. Beck told Kesta Desmond and David Nicholls for their book Home and Away Annual that "Kim's appearance belies her bizarre behaviour, she keeps herself immaculately groomed." Beck said that while Kim makes an effort to apply make-up and sport "beautiful clothes", she is actually aware of her addiction behind the facade. Kim thinks that "everyone else is doing it" and uses this as a reason to defend her addiction. Beck said that Kim lives by the motto of "Why not enjoy life to the full while you are young?"

Kim arrives to visit her brother, Grant. She steals some money left by the phone by Grant's flatmate Matt Wilson (Greg Benson). Matt and Steven Matheson (Adam Willits) discover Kim is a drug addict when she asks both of them if they can get hold of some drugs for her. They both agonise about telling Grant. When Kim fails to return home from a night out in Yabbie Creek, Grant is worried and when she returns Kim invents a story. Matt urges Kim to come clean about her habit. Kim then begins stealing to fund her habit. She steals Carly Lucini's (Sharyn Hodgson) purse while she is distracted and spends the money on a picnic for her and Grant. Matt issues an ultimatum to Kim; return to Carly's purse or he will tell Grant the truth. Kim then steals a cheque from Grant to pay Eddie (Peter Williams), a dealer and forges his signature. Steven eventually tells Grant and he is shocked as, he originally put Kim's behaviour down to typical teenage problems. Grant searches Kim's bag and discovers speed pills and pours them down the sink. He then takes her to task about it and she reveals she has been using for several months. Grant seeks advice and arranges for Kim to go to rehab, Kim is grateful as she finds Grant has effectively sacrificed his position at Summer Bay High to go with her. After Grant phones their parents about going holiday but does not mention the drugs, Kim thanks him but he tells her he did it for their parents and will tell them should she relapse. They leave. Grant returns several months later and reveals Kim has made progress.

Others

References

External links
Characters and cast at the Official AU Home and Away website
Characters and cast at the Official UK Home and Away website
Characters and cast at the Internet Movie Database

, 1990
, Home and Away